Vice-Admiral Perry Mayne (c.1697 – 5 August 1761) was a Royal Navy officer who served as Commander-in-Chief, The Nore from 1746 to 1747.

Naval career
Mayne became commanding officer of the sloop  in 1724. Promoted to captain in September 1725, he commanded, successively, the fourth-rate HMS Dragon, the sixth-rate , the third-rate  and the fourth-rate . He saw action at the battle of Porto Bello in November 1739 and at the battle of Cartagena de Indias in May 1741. After that he commanded the third-rate , then the third-rate  and finally the third-rate HMS Orford again. He served as Commander-in-Chief, The Nore from 1746 to 1747.

Mayne presided over the courtmartial of Admirals Thomas Mathews and Richard Lestock in May 1746. He lived at a house which he named "Portobello", to recall the battle in which he had seen action, in Mortlake.

References

1697 births
1761 deaths
Royal Navy vice admirals